Future Internet is a general term for research activities on new architectures for the  Internet.

History
While the technical development of the Internet was an extensive research topic from the beginning, an increased public awareness of several critical shortcomings in terms of performance, reliability, scalability, security and many other categories  including societal, economical and business aspects, led to future Internet research efforts.
The time horizon of future Internet studies is typically long term, taking several years before significant deployments take place.

Approaches towards a future Internet range from small, incremental evolutionary steps to complete redesigns (clean slate) and architecture principles, where the applied technologies shall not be limited by existing standards or paradigms such as client server networking, which, for example, might evolve into co-operative peer structures. The fact that an IP address denotes both the identifier as well as the locator of an end system, sometimes referred to as semantic overload, is an example of a conceptual shortcoming of the Internet protocol suite architecture. Approaches called "clean slate" are based on experience that supplementary or late additions to an original and established design are limited in their acceptance and introduction. Technical examples for evolutionary approaches include supplements to existing Internet technology, such as differentiated services, reliable server pooling, SCTP, Locator/Identifier Separation Protocol, Site Multihoming by IPv6 Intermediation or Internet Protocol version 6.

Non-technical aspects of a future Internet span large areas such as socio-economics, business and environmental issues. The Organisation for Economic Co-operation and Development held a conference called "Shaping Policies for a Digital World" in 2008. It proposed activities such as publishing recommendations for the future of the Internet economy.

Research areas that could be seen as components of a future Internet include network management, network virtualization, and treating any kind of information as objects, independent of their storage or location.

Elements of cloud computing blended into the notion of future Internet, leading to the concept of cloud networking.

While future Internet is often associated with the Global Environment for Network Innovations initiatives of the US National Science Foundation (NSF), other international research programmes have adopted this term. 
A 100x100 Clean Slate project ran from about 2003 through 2005. Its name comes from estimating 100 Mbit/s connectivity to about 100 million homes in the US.
Another "clean slate" project hosted at Stanford University, ran from 2007 to 2012, including faculty such as Nick McKeown, David Cheriton and Dan Boneh.

The AKARI Project is Japan's "architecture design project for new generation network" with implementation expected in 2015.

Future Internet Research and Experimentation is a research program funded by the European Union to foster research on the future developments of Internet technology and services. 
Two meetings were held in 2007.
Some projects were funded in 2008, and more in 2011.

Future Internet testbeds experimentation between BRazil and Europe (FIBRE) is a research project co-funded by the Brazilian Council for Scientific and Technological Development (CNPq) and the European Commission under the FP7 Cooperation Programme. The main objective of the project is the design, implementation and validation of a shared future Internet research facility. Also in Brazil, there is the NovaGenesis project, which started in 2008 and aims at integrating information- and service-centric approaches with mobile-friendly, software-defined, and name-based self-organization.

The EC Future Internet Architecture (FIArch) Experts Reference Group (ERG) wrote a paper about design principles and proposed seeds for new principles.

See also
 History of the Internet

References

External links

 Global Environment for Network Innovations (GENI)
 The Atomic Redesign of the Internet Future Architecture (TARIFA)
 ITU-T Study Group 13 (SG13) on Future Networks including mobile and NGN, focus group FG-FN, Q21/13

Future
Emerging technologies